John Zuinglius Anderson (March 22, 1904 – February 9, 1981) was an American farmer and politician who served seven terms as a U.S. Representative from California from 1939 to 1953.

Early life and career 
Born in Oakland, California, Anderson moved with his parents to Santa Cruz, California, the same year, and to San Jose, California, in 1913, attended the public schools.
He was graduated from San Jose High School in 1923.
He moved to San Juan Bautista, California, in 1925 and engaged in agricultural pursuits and fruit growing.

Congress 
Anderson was elected as a Republican to the Seventy-sixth and to the six succeeding Congresses (January 3, 1939 – January 3, 1953).
He was a strong supporter of forcing Japanese-American citizens from the Pacific Coast states during World War II, stating in 1945: "As a member of the California congressional delegation I have consistently opposed the return of the Japanese-Americans to the Pacific coast while the war against Japan in the Pacific is in progress. I was one of those who as early as Dec. 8, 1941, advocated the immediate removal of all persons of Japanese descent from restricted and prohibited areas in California, Oregon and Washington."

He was not a candidate for renomination in 1952.

Career after Congress 
He served as member of board of directors of Bank of America.
He served as president of California Canning Pear Association and Pacific States Canning Pear Association.
With Department of Agriculture in 1954 and 1955.
Administrative assistant to President Eisenhower from December 15, 1956, to January 20, 1961.
He served as member of staff of Veterans' Affairs Committee, House of Representatives until June 30, 1962.
He retired.

Death
He retired to Hollister, California, where he died of a self-inflicted gunshot wound February 9, 1981.
Cremated.
Ashes scattered at the top of Sonora Pass, Sierra Nevada Mountains.

References

External links 
 Records and Papers of Jack Z. Anderson, Dwight D. Eisenhower Presidential Library

1904 births
1981 deaths
American politicians who committed suicide
Suicides by firearm in California
Eisenhower administration personnel
San Francisco Bay Area politicians
Politicians from Oakland, California
Republican Party members of the United States House of Representatives from California
20th-century American politicians
People from Hollister, California
People from San Juan Bautista, California
1981 suicides